Adorjan Dorian Otvos (11 October 1893 – 25 August 1945) was a writer and composer in Hollywood. He was born in Hungary. He worked on several Broadway productions as well as Vitaphone short films, often as a co-writer.

His mother died when he was young.

His library of Rudyard Kipling works was auctioned in 1939.

Filmography 
 Smash Your Baggage (1932) 
 Pie Pie Blackbird (1932)
 That Goes Double (1932)
 Pleasure Island (1933), co-wrote story with Burnet Hershey
 Rufus Jones for President (1933)
 Seasoned Greetings (1933)
 Use Your Imagination (1933)
 Service with a Smile (1934) co-wrote
 The Black Network (1936)
 College Dads (1936)
 The Double Crossky (1936)
 Sheik to Sheik (1936)
 Sweethearts and Flowers (1936)
 The Blonde Bomber (1936)
 The Backyard Broadcast (1936)
 Trouble in Toyland (1936)
 Love in a Bungalow (1937)
 Behind the Mike (1937)
 Merry-Go-Round of 1938 (1937)
 Flirting with Fate (1938) co-wrote story
 The Devil's Party (1938)
 Goodbye Broadway (1938)

References 

1893 births
1945 deaths
20th-century American composers
20th-century American dramatists and playwrights
20th-century American male writers
American film score composers
American male dramatists and playwrights
American male screenwriters
Hungarian emigrants to the United States
Screenwriters from California
20th-century American screenwriters